Arnidiol is a cytotoxic triterpene with the molecular formula C30H50O2. Arnidiol has been first isolated from the bloom of the plant Arnica montana. Arnidiol has also been isolated from the plant Taraxacum officinale.

References

Further reading 

 
 
 

Triterpenes
Diols
Vinylidene compounds